Magyar Szó (lit. Hungarian Word) is a Hungarian-language daily newspaper in Vojvodina, Serbia. It was founded in 1944, with the purpose of serving as the information source for the Hungarian minority of Vojvodina. It is published in Novi Sad. Magyar Szó is considered the main ethnic Hungarian media in Serbia and in the Autonomous Province of Vojvodina. To begin with, the newspaper was called Szabad Vajdaság, but the name was changed to Magyar Szó in 1945.

Newspapers with same name
There was and is a number of newspapers that bare the same name. Here is a partial list of them:
 Magyar Szó (1900–1907) – a daily newspaper published in Budapest at the beginning of the 20th century;
 Magyar Szó (1919–1920) – belletristic weekly magazine, published in Oradea;
 Magyar Szó (1929–1937) – a daily newspaper, published in Oradea;
 Magyar Szó (London) – newspaper, briefly published by Hungarian diaspora in London, during and after the 1956 Revolution;
 Magyar Szó (New Zealand) – Bulletin of the Hungarian Community in New Zealand. .

See also
 List of newspapers in Serbia
 Hungarians in Vojvodina
 Libertatea (Pančevo)

References

External links
 Magyar Szó Online

Hungarian-language newspapers
Culture of Vojvodina
Mass media in Novi Sad
Mass media in Subotica
Newspapers published in Serbia
Publications established in 1944
1944 establishments in Yugoslavia
Hungarians in Vojvodina